The Beverly Road station is a station on the IRT Nostrand Avenue Line of the New York City Subway. It is located at the intersection of Beverley Road and Nostrand Avenue straddling the East Flatbush and Flatbush communities. The station is served by the 2 train at all times and the 5 train on weekdays.

History 
The Dual Contracts, which were signed on March 19, 1913, were contracts for the construction and/or rehabilitation and operation of rapid transit lines in the City of New York. The Dual Contracts promised the construction of several lines in Brooklyn. As part of Contract 4, the IRT agreed to build a subway line along Nostrand Avenue in Brooklyn. The construction of the subway along Nostrand Avenue spurred real estate development in the surrounding areas. The Nostrand Avenue Line opened on August 23, 1920, and the Beverly Road station opened along with it.

During the 1950s the platforms were lengthened at their southern ends, so that the platforms could be 510 feet long and as a result they were then able to accommodate 10-car trains.

Station layout 

This underground station has two tracks and two side platforms. Both platforms have their original IRT style trim line and name tablets. The trim line is pink with a brown border and "B" tablets for "Beverly" running at regular intervals. The name tablets read "BEVERLY ROAD" in a serif font on a brown background and pink border. The platforms only have I-beam columns near fare control in the center and these are painted yellow. The platforms are narrower and have cinder-block tiles at either ends, where they were extended in the 1950s to accommodate the current standard "A" Division train length of 510 feet. Here, there are signs reading "BEVERLY ROAD" in white arial font on a gray background.

This station's name is spelled with two "e"s while the Beverley Road station on the BMT Brighton Line on the same street is spelled with three "e"s. That is because the street is split in half at Flatbush Avenue. To the west, it is spelled with three "e"s and to the east, formerly with two.

Exits

Each platform has one fare control area on the same level and there are no crossovers or crossunders to allow free transfers between directions. The Manhattan-bound one has a small turnstile bank, token booth, and one staircase going up to the southeast corner of Beverly Road and Nostrand Avenue. The Flatbush Avenue-bound platform's fare control is unstaffed, containing two exit-only turnstiles, one High Entry/Exit Turnstile, and one staircase going up to the southwest corner of Beverly Road and Nostrand Avenue.

References

External links 
 
 

IRT Nostrand Avenue Line stations
New York City Subway stations in Brooklyn
Railway stations in the United States opened in 1920
1920 establishments in New York City
Flatbush, Brooklyn